The Frederick Laue House is located in Alma, Wisconsin.

History
Frederick Laue ran Alma's largest lumber mill and was a founder of the Beef Slough Log Driving Company. The house was listed on the National Register of Historic Places in 1979 and on the State Register of Historic Places in 1989.  It served as a bed and breakfast before the owners' retirement, closing in 2016.

The home of his son, known as the Frederick Laue Jr. House, is located next door.

References

Houses on the National Register of Historic Places in Wisconsin
Hotel buildings on the National Register of Historic Places in Wisconsin
National Register of Historic Places in Buffalo County, Wisconsin
Houses in Buffalo County, Wisconsin
Italianate architecture in Wisconsin
Brick buildings and structures
Houses completed in 1866